Schaible is a surname. Notable people with the surname include:

Donald Schaible (born 1957), American politician
Grace Berg Schaible (1925–2017), American lawyer and politician
Ivo Schaible (1912–1990), German Catholic priest and artist